Darren Senter (born 28 March 1972) is an Australian former professional rugby league footballer who played in the 1990s and 2000s. He played for the Canterbury-Bankstown Bulldogs, Balmain Tigers and Wests Tigers. Senter primarily played in the  position. He captained the Tigers from 1999 until 2004.

Background
Senter was born in Sydney, New South Wales, Australia.

Playing career
Senter made his first grade debut for Canterbury in 1992 against Eastern Suburbs.  Senter primarily played second-row and lock at Canterbury in his 3 years at the club.

In 1995, Senter joined the newly named "Sydney Tigers" as Balmain changed their name and relocated out to Parramatta Stadium at the start of the super league war.  In 1996, Senter switched positions from second-row to hooker.

In 1997, the "Sydney Tigers" name was dropped and reverted to Balmain, the club also returned to Leichhardt Oval for the first time in 2 seasons.  Senter went on to become a mainstay at the club and played with the team until the end of 1999 when Balmain merged with other foundation club Western Suburbs to form the Wests Tigers.  Senter played in Balmain's final ever match as a stand-alone club which was a 42–14 loss against Canberra.

In 2000, Senter became the inaugural captain of the Wests Tigers.  Senter went on to make 96 appearances for the club before retiring at the end of 2004.

Footnotes

External links
Darren Center Bulldogs player profile

1972 births
Living people
Australian rugby league players
Balmain Tigers players
New South Wales City Origin rugby league team players
Canterbury-Bankstown Bulldogs players
Wests Tigers players
Rugby league hookers
Rugby league players from Sydney